Robert Goethals (16 June 1922 – 7 July 2011) was a Belgian soccer player who was best known as coach.

Playing career

Club
Born in Brasschaat, Goethals played at AA Gent during and after the Second World War. He played 19 games with the team in the First Division. 1948, Goethals signed a contract in Third Division SV Waregem and he finished his career at SK Roeselare in Fourth Division.

Managerial career
Goethals studied Physical Education and started a career as coach after his playing career. In 1978–79, he graduated to First Division. Before, he had been the coach of, among others VG Oostende and KSV Waregem. Goethals was the successor of Urbain Braems at SK Beveren. 1979, Beveren was champion in First Division ahead of RSC Anderlecht which was coached by his namesake Raymond Goethals.

The year Beveren won the title, the team played as Cup winner in the  Europacup II. Goethals coached his team in the quarter finals beyond Internazionale. In the semi-finals, the team lost 0–1 to FC Barcelona.

In 1980, Beveren reached once again the finals of the Belgian Cup, but the Limburg team Waterschei SV Thor won this game by 2–1. Goethals stayed one more season at Beveren and was succeeded by his predecessor Braems.

Goethals started at AA Gent, with players such as Tony Rombouts, Aad Koudijzer, Jean-Claude Bouvy, and Johan Vermeersch. He guided Gent to the subtop of Belgium, in contrast to a pair of seasons before, when it played in Second Division. Several times he won a European ticket. In 1984, Gent reached the finals of the Cup. After extra time, the Buffalos beat Standard de Liège by 2–0. It was the second trophy in the history of the team. At the end of the season, Goethals left and started working for the KBVB.

When the Pro Licence was started in 1998, Goethals was appointed as a teacher, together with his contemporaries Raymond Goethals and Guy Thys. In those days, he taught, among others, Georges Leekens, Hugo Broos, and Aimé Anthuenis. He did this job in service of the Pro Licence until 2003. He died in Ypres.

1922 births
2011 deaths
Association footballers not categorized by position
Belgian footballers
K.A.A. Gent players
K.V. Mechelen players
K.S.V. Waregem players
K.S.V. Roeselare players
Belgian football managers
K.S.V. Waregem managers
K.S.V. Roeselare managers
K.V. Oostende managers
K.S.K. Beveren managers
K.A.A. Gent managers
People from Brasschaat
Footballers from Antwerp Province